Ravi Motorcycles is a Pakistani motorcycle manufacturer, based in Lahore, Pakistan since 2004. Ravi Motorcycles is also the authorized assembler and manufacturer of Derbi and Piaggio motorcycles in Pakistan. Ravi Motorcycles also launched the iconic Vespa scooter in Pakistan in 2018.

History
Ravi Motorcycles is a subsidiary of Ravi Automobiles, which was founded in 1951. The motorcycle division was established in 2004.

Products

Ravi
 Ravi Hamsafar Plus 70
 Ravi Premium R1 70
 Ravi Premium RX 125

Ravi Piaggio
 Storm 125

Ravi Vespa
 Vespa Primavera

Ravi Derbi
 Derbi STX 150 and ETX 150

References

External links
 Ravi Motorcycles official website

Motorcycle manufacturers of Pakistan
Manufacturing companies based in Lahore
Vehicle manufacturing companies established in 2004
Pakistani companies established in 2004
Piaggio Group